Mecyclothorax ovalipennis is a species of ground beetle in the subfamily Psydrinae. It was described by Perrault in 1988.

References

ovalipennis
Beetles described in 1988